
Henkjan Honing (born 1959 in Hilversum) is a Dutch researcher. He is professor of Music Cognition at both the Faculty of Humanities and the Faculty of Science of the University of Amsterdam. He conducts his research under the auspices of the Institute for Logic, Language and Computation, and the University of Amsterdam's Brain and Cognition center.

Honing obtained his PhD at City University (London) in 1991 with research into the representation of time and temporal structure in music. During the period between 1992 and 1997, he worked as a KNAW Research Fellow (Academieonderzoeker) at the University of Amsterdam's Institute for Logic, Language and Computation, where he conducted a study on the formalization of musical knowledge. Up until 2003, he worked as a research coordinator at the Nijmegen Institute for Cognition and Information (now F.C. Donders Centre for Cognitive Neuroimaging) where he specialized in the computational modeling of music cognition. In 2007, he was appointed Associate Professor in Music Cognition at the University of Amsterdam's Musicology capacity group. In 2010 he was awarded the KNAW-Hendrik Muller chair, designated on behalf of the Royal Netherlands Academy of Arts and Sciences. In 2012 he was appointed strategic Professor of Cognitive and Computational Musicology, and in 2014 he became full professor in Music Cognition at both the Faculty of Humanities and the Faculty of Science of the University of Amsterdam. In 2013 he received a Distinguished Lorentz Fellowship, a prize granted by the Lorentz Center for the Sciences and the Netherlands Institute for Advanced Study in the Humanities and Social Sciences. In 2019 Honing was elected member of the Royal Netherlands Academy of Arts and Sciences.

Henkjan Honing authored over 200 scientific publications in the areas of music cognition, musicality and music technology, and published several books for a general audience, including Iedereen is muzikaal. Wat we weten over het luisteren naar muziek (Nieuw Amsterdam, 2009/2012), published in English as Music Cognition: The Basics (Routledge, 2021), and Aap slaat maat. Op zoek naar de oorsprong van muzikaliteit bij mens en dier (Nieuw Amsterdam, 2018) that appeared in English as The Evolving Animal Orchestra: In Search of What Makes Us Musical (2019, The MIT Press). In 2018 a research agenda on the topic of musicality appeared as The Origins of Musicality (2018, The MIT Press).

Henkjan is the older brother of saxophonist Yuri Honing and drummer Bill Honing.

Selected studies

 
 Complete list of publications

References

External links
 Music Cognition Group (MCG) at the University of Amsterdam

1959 births
Living people
Music psychologists
Dutch cognitive scientists
Academics of City, University of London
Academic staff of the University of Amsterdam
People from Hilversum
Members of the Royal Netherlands Academy of Arts and Sciences